Currimundi is a coastal suburb of Caloundra in the Sunshine Coast Region, Queensland, Australia.

Geography 

Currimundi Lake is a saltwater lake situated beside Currimundi Beach. North of the lake is the Kathleen McArthur Conservation Park. Nicklin Way, the main road between Caloundra and Maroochydore, crosses Ahern Bridge over Currimundi Lake. The Ahern Bridge was named after John Ahern, a firefighter who saved many lives and won a bravery award. Currimundi attracts many tourists in the holidays and the beach is patrolled by Surf Life Saving Australia on weekends and school holidays.

The shopping centre at Currimundi is called the Currimundi Markets.

History 
It was named by Queensland Governor Sir Leslie Wilson, in which he used the local aboriginal name for the area, Garamandah or Girramundi, meaning "place of flying foxes".

During World War II, Currimundi Lake and the beach areas to its north were used for defence purposes and artillery practice.

Currimundi State School opened on 24 January 1977.

Talara Primary College opened on 22 January 1998.

Education 
Currimundi State School is a government primary (Prep to Year 6) school for boys and girls at 17 Buderim Street. In 2018, the school had an enrolment of 579 students with 48 teachers (38 full-time equivalent) and 26 non-teaching staff (17 full-time equivalent). It includes a special education program.

Talara Primary College is a government primary (Early Childhood to Year 6) school for boys and girls at Talara Street. In 2018, the school had an enrolment of 1,132 students with 79 teachers (69 full-time equivalent) and 47 non-teaching staff (31 full-time equivalent). It includes a special education program.

The nearest government secondary schools are Caloundra State High School, Kawana Waters State College and Meridan State College.

In popular culture 
The lake features in a children's book, The Oobleegooblers of Lake Curramundi by Kath Dewhurst, published in 1977, which is based on a local Aboriginal story.

References

External links

 

Suburbs of the Sunshine Coast Region
Caloundra
Coastline of Queensland